Silosca is a genus of moths belonging to the family Tineidae. The genus was described in 1965 by Hungarian entomologist László Anthony Gozmány.

All species in this genus are only known from African countries.

Species
Silosca comorensis Gozmány, 1968 
Silosca hypsocola Gozmány, 1968 
Silosca licziae Gozmány, 1967 
Silosca mariae 	Gozmány, 1965 
Silosca savannae Gozmány, 1968 
Silosca somnis 	Gozmány, 1967 
Silosca superba Gozmány, 1967

References

Siloscinae
Tineidae genera